This is a list of Swedish architects, including foreign-born architects who have worked in Sweden.

A–M

 Johan Fredrik Åbom (1817-1900)
 Carl-Axel Acking (1910-2001)
 Carl Fredrik Adelcrantz (1716-1796)
 Uno Åhrén (1897-1977)
 Axel Johan Anderberg (1860-1937)
 Erik Asmussen (1913-1998)
 Gunnar Asplund (1885-1940)
 Fredrik Blom (1781-1853)
 Ferdinand Boberg (1860-1946)
 Étienne de Bonneuil (late 13th century), Uppsala Cathedral 
 Carl Georg Brunius (1793-1869)
 Peter Celsing (1920-1974)
 William Chambers (1723-1796)
 Isak Gustaf Clason (1856-1930)
 Carl Johan Cronstedt (1709-1777)
 Erik Dahlbergh (1625-1703)
 Gösta Danielsson (1912-1978)
 Louis Jean Desprez (1743-1804)
 Fritz Eckert (1852-1920)
 Adolf W. Edelsvärd (1824-1919)
 Rudolf S. Enblom (1861-1945)
 Ralph Erskine (1914-2005)
 Léonie Geisendorf (1914-2016)
 Carl Christoffer Gjörwell (1766-1837)
 Torben Grut (1871-1945)
 Axel Haig (1835-1921)
Margit Hall (1901-1937), first woman in Sweden to graduate in architecture as an ordinary student
 Carl Hårleman (1700-1753)
 Martin Hedmark (1896-1980)
 Paul Hedqvist (1895-1977)
 Cyrillus Johansson (1884-1959)
 Sigurd Lewerentz (1885-1975)
 Fredrik Lilljekvist (1863-1932)
 Bengt Lindroos (1918-2010)
 Jonas Lindvall (born 1963)
 Sture Ljungqvist (1921-2004)
 Sven Markelius (1889-1972)
 Bruno Mathsson (1907-1988)

N–Z

 Carl Nyrén (1917-2011)
 Ragnar Östberg (1866-1945)
 Franciscus Pahr (died 1580), worked on the Uppsala Castle, the Uppsala Cathedral and Stockholm Palace
 Erik Palmstedt (1741-1803)
 Fredrik Magnus Piper (1746-1824)
Hillevi Svedberg (1910–1990), collective housing
 Olof Tempelman (1745-1816)
 Ivar Tengbom (1878-1968)
 Nicodemus Tessin the Elder (1615-1681)
 Nicodemus Tessin the Younger (1654-1728)
 Jean de la Vallée (1620-1696)
 Simon de la Vallée (1590-1642)
 Justus Vingboons (1620-1698)
 Carl Westman (1866-1936)
 Hans Westman (1905-1991)
 Sidney White (1892-1949)
 Tage William-Olsson (1888-1960)
 Gert Wingårdh (born 1951)
 Folke Zettervall (1862-1955)
 Helgo Zetterwall (1831-1907)

See also

 Architecture of Sweden
 List of architects
 List of Swedish people

Swedes
Architects

sv:Alfabetisk lista över svenska arkitekter